All I Want For Christmas Is You (also known as Mariah Carey's All I Want For Christmas Is You) is a 2017 American computer-animated Christmas film based on the song by Mariah Carey and the book by Carey herself and Colleen Madden. The film stars the voices of Mariah Carey, Breanna Yde, Lacey Chabert and Henry Winkler.

Premise
Based on her iconic Christmas song, this movie features Mariah Carey's music and narration in a loving story about little Mariah's Christmas wish for a puppy.

Cast

Soundtrack
Mariah Carey's All I Want For Christmas Is You (Original Motion Picture Soundtrack) was released as the soundtrack alongside the release of the film. It features Christmas covers and classics by Carey and two of the voice cast members, as well as a brand new song by Carey called "Lil Snowman". In Japan, it was released on November 22, 2017.

Track listing
Credits adapted from Spotify.

See also
 List of Christmas films

References

External links
 

American Christmas films
2017 films
2010s American animated films
Universal Animation Studios animated films
2017 computer-animated films
2010s Christmas films
American children's animated comedy films
2010s English-language films